Onnanam Kunnil Oradi Kunnil is a 1985 Indian Malayalam-language screwball comedy film written and directed by Priyadarshan. The film stars Mohanlal, Shankar, Sukumari, Prem Prakash and Sankaradi. The film has musical score by Raghu Kumar.

Plot 

Nithin (Mohanlal) and Anand (Shankar) are jobless roadside romeos from rich families. One day, Anand meets Shobha (Pooja Saxena) and falls in love with her. However, Nithin realizes that she is the daughter of his father's old friends. In an attempt to impress Shobha, Anand gets severely injured and the doctor suggests that he needs to be amputated. In the process of better treatment, his brother and Nithin take him to a hospital in Tamil Nadu, where his condition improves.

Anand writes letters to Nithin asking him to hand them over to Shobha. On his daily walks, Anand meets  Meenakshi (Lissy), an innocent girl who reminds him of his sister. They develop a strong bonding and Meenakshi starts seeing him as her long-dead brother who she believed would come back one day.

Once this condition is improved, Anand is back to see Shobha married to Nithin. He realizes that Nithin cleverly hid the fact that Anand is improving and never handed over the letters to Shobha. Instead, he made her believe that Anand is amputated and will never return. Shobha is now loyal to her husband and informs Anand that she will always be a faithful wife. Anand leaves the city and meets Meenakshi as her brother.

Cast

Mohanlal as Nithin
Shankar as Anand
Lissy as Meenakshi
Pooja Saxena as Shobha
Prem Prakash as Anand's brother Balan
Sankaradi as Col. Raghavan Nair
Sukumari as Nithin's mother Lakshmi
Sreenivasan as Muthu
K. P. A. C. Azeez
Noohu
Thodupuzha Vasanthi as Shobha's mother
Vinduja Menon
Lathika

Soundtrack
The music was composed by Raghu Kumar with lyrics by Chunakkara Ramankutty.

References

External links
 

1985 films
1980s Malayalam-language films
Films directed by Priyadarshan
Films scored by Raghu Kumar